is a city in Aichi Prefecture, Japan. , the city had an estimated population of 127,659 in 56,573 households, and a population density of 1,146 persons per km².

Geography
Seto is located in the hilly northern region of Aichi Prefecture, bordering Gifu Prefecture, approximately 35 minutes from Nagoya by way of the Meitetsu Seto Line. In English, the name of "Seto" translates to "the place where the river runs quickly." However, while there is a river in Seto, it is neither significantly large nor quick-moving. The main street along the river is lined with dozens of pottery shops. Every third Saturday and Sunday in September, there is a very large pottery festival called Setomono Matsuri(瀬戸物祭り) This festival attracts about 20,000 visitors from around Japan and abroad every year.

Climate
The city has a climate characterized by hot and humid summers, and relatively mild winters (Köppen climate classification Cfa).  The average annual temperature in Seto is 14.8 °C. The average annual rainfall is 1810 mm with September as the wettest month. The temperatures are highest on average in August, at around 27.3 °C, and lowest in January, at around 3.1 °C.

Surrounding municipalities
Aichi Prefecture
Nagoya（Moriyama-ku）
Kasugai
Owariasahi
Toyota
Nagakute
Gifu Prefecture
Toki
Tajimi

Demographics
Per Japanese census data, the population of Seto has been increasing over the past 60 years.

History

Middle Ages
The area had been famous for its ceramics production since at least the Kamakura period.

Early modern period
During the Edo period, the area of modern Seto was controlled by the Owari Tokugawa of Owari Domain.

Late modern period
During the Meiji period, Seto village was organized in 1888 with the establishment of the modern municipalities system, becoming a town in 1892.
After annexing the neighboring village of Akatsu in 1925, Seto was raised to city status on October 1, 1929.

Much of the city was destroyed by air raids in 1945 during World War II.

Contemporary history
In the postwar period, the city grew as a bedroom community for Nagoya and as a tourist designation. On March 25, 2005, Expo 2005 opened with its main site being in Nagakute and additional activity in Seto.
The expo continued until September 25, 2005.

Government

Seto has a mayor-council form of government with a directly elected mayor and a unicameral city legislature of 26 members. The city contributes two members to the Aichi Prefectural Assembly.  In terms of national politics, the city is part of Aichi District 6 of the lower house of the Diet of Japan.

External relations

Twin towns – Sister cities

International
Sister city
Limoges（Haute-Vienne, Nouvelle-Aquitaine, France）
since November 18, 2003
Nabeul（Nabeul Governorate, Tunisia）
since November 8, 2004
Icheon（Gyeonggi Province, Korea）
since April 20, 2006
Friendship city
Jingdezhen（Jiangxi, China）
since October 1996

Economy
The economy of Seto remains dominated by ceramics, both for traditional works for private consumption, and also modern industrial ceramics for the electronics industry.

Education

University
Nagoya Gakuin University – Seto campus

Schools
Primary and secondary education
Seto has 20 public elementary schools and eight public junior high schools operated by the city government, and one private junior high school. The city has four public high schools operated by the Aichi Prefectural Board of Education. and two private high schools. The city operates one and the prefecture operates two special education schools for the handicapped.

International School
The Aichi Korean 7th Elementary School (愛知朝鮮第七初級学校) – North Korean school is located in Seto

Transportation

Railways

Conventional lines
 Aichi Loop Railway
Aichi Loop Line：-  –  –  –  –
 Meitetsu
Seto Line：-  - –  –

Roads

Expressway
 Tōkai-Kanjō Expressway

Japan National Route

Local attractions
Aichi Prefectural Ceramic Museum
Setogura Museum
Jōkō-ji, Buddhist temple and mausoleum of Tokugawa Yoshinao of the Owari Domain.

Notable people from Seto

Sayaka Aoki, comedian
Junji Suzuki, politician
Asaka Seto, actress
Manpei Takagi, actor
Toru Hasegawa,– professional soccer player
Hayata Ito, professional baseball player
Sōta Fujii, professional shogi player
Manabu Kubota, former Japanese Association football player;

References

External links

 
  

 
Cities in Aichi Prefecture